Fahriye Sultan (Ottoman Turkish: فهریه سلطان; died in 1656), also known as Fahri Sultan was an Ottoman princess, daughter of Sultan Murad III (reign 1574–1595) of the Ottoman Empire. Her mother possibly was Safiye Sultan if she born after Safiye's return from exile in the Old Palace. In 1595 her father died and her brother, Mehmed III ascended to the throne. There is no information that Fahriye was married during her brother's reign so it is believed that she remained unmarried. In 1603 her brother died and her thirteen-year-old nephew ascended to the throne. Ahmed married Fahriye to Çuhadar Ahmed Pasha in 1604. The marriage remained childless and the pasha died in 1618. When Osman II deposed Mustafa I, Fahriye lived in the main palace and received the same salary as other members of the dynasty. One year after Ahmed Pasha's death, she had to marry Sofu Bayram Pasha. Sofu Bayram Pasha died in 1627. After the death of his second wife, Fahriye Sultan did not remarry and lived as a widow.

In popular culture 
In the 2015 TV series Muhteşem Yüzyıl: Kösem, Fahriye Sultan is portrayed by Turkish actress Gülcan Arslan. However, her fate is rather inaccurately portrayed and the story of Fahriye is more like that of Ayşe Sultan another daughter of Murad III.

References 

16th-century Ottoman princesses

Year of birth missing
1656 deaths